Paul Fitzgerald is an American journalist.

Bibliography 
Crossing Zero: The AfPak War at the Turning Point of American Empire (City Lights Publishers, 2010) .
Invisible History: Afghanistan's Untold Story (City Lights Publishers, 2009) 
The Voice (CreateSpace, 2008) 
End of illusion (BookSurge, 2001)
''The Valediction: Three Nights of Desmond (TrineDay, 2021)

References

External links 
CNN Interview with Paul Fitzgerald and Elizabeth Gould
Elizabeth Gould appearances on C-Span Book TV
Boston Globe article on Afghanistan, Paul Fitzgerald & Elizabeth Gould
Paul and Elizabeth Gould on Book TV YouTube

American male journalists
Living people
Year of birth missing (living people)